Michael John Foster (born 14 March 1963) is a former Labour Party politician in the United Kingdom, who was the Member of Parliament (MP) for Worcester from 1997 until 2010, and was the Parliamentary Under-Secretary of State at the Department for International Development.

Early life
Michael Foster was born in Birmingham and was educated at the Great Wyrley High School in Great Wyrley near Cannock, and Wolverhampton Polytechnic (now Wolverhampton University) where he was awarded a Bachelor of Arts degree in economics in 1984.  He later studied at the University of Wolverhampton where he received a Postgraduate Certificate in Education in 1995.

He joined Jaguar Cars in 1984 as a financial analyst, becoming a senior analyst in 1985 and a management accountant in 1987.  He left Jaguar in 1991 to become a lecturer in accountancy and finance at Worcester College of Technology, where he remained until he became an MP.

Parliamentary career
He joined the Labour Party in 1980, and was a shop steward for the Transport and General Workers' Union for two years from 1986. He became the secretary of the Worcestershire Mid Constituency Labour Party in 1987, and the secretary of the Worcester Constituency Labour Party for three years from 1992.  Michael Foster was elected to the House of Commons at the 1997 General Election for Worcester with a majority of 7,425, and remained the MP there until 2010.  He made his maiden speech on 2 June 1997, where he spoke of the constituency and the Royal Worcester porcelain. He was the first Labour MP to represent Worcester in Parliament.

He joined the education and employment select committee in 1999, and after the 2001 General Election he served as the Parliamentary Private Secretary (PPS) to the Minister of State at the Department for Education and Skills Margaret Hodge. After the 2005 General Election he became the PPS to the Secretary of State for Northern Ireland Peter Hain. In the reshuffle of May 2006, he entered the government as an assistant whip. In another reshuffle in October 2008, he was promoted to be a Parliamentary Under-Secretary of State at the Department for International Development.

Foster introduced a private member's bill to ban hunting with dogs in 1997; although his bill did not become law, its principles were later passed into law by the Hunting Act 2004.

Foster lost his seat to Robin Walker Conservative in the May 2010 election.

External links 
 Michael Foster official site
 Guardian Unlimited Politics – Ask Aristotle: Michael Foster MP
 TheyWorkForYou.com – Michael Foster MP
 
 BBC Politics page

News items 
 Wanting school kitchens to be improved in March 2005
 Wanting to scrap district councils in Worcestershire in January 2006
 Helping a newsagent get his lottery machine back in March 2004
 Protecting Worcester Sauce in March 2005

1963 births
Living people
Alumni of the University of Wolverhampton
Labour Party (UK) MPs for English constituencies
UK MPs 1997–2001
UK MPs 2001–2005
UK MPs 2005–2010
Members of the Parliament of the United Kingdom for Worcester